Horance Laban White Jr. (May 1, 1916 – January 31, 2015) was an attorney and politician from West Virginia who served as Speaker of the West Virginia House of Delegates.

References

1916 births
2015 deaths
20th-century American lawyers
20th-century American politicians
Speakers of the West Virginia House of Delegates
Democratic Party members of the West Virginia House of Delegates
West Virginia lawyers
People from Spencer, West Virginia
Military personnel from West Virginia